The Evian Championship, currently known for sponsorship reasons as The Amundi Evian Championship, is a women's professional golf tournament in France, played at the Evian Resort Golf Club in Évian-les-Bains. It was originally held in June, moved to July in 2003, and moved again to September in 2013. It returned to a July date in 2019.

Founded  in 1994 on the Ladies European Tour (LET) as the Evian Masters, it is one of two major championships on the LET. Not originally a major on the LPGA Tour, it became an LPGA co-sanctioned event in 2000, which included a significant increase in purse size. The purse was increased from $4.1 million to $4.5 million effective with the 2021 event. The 2022 event saw an increase in the purse to $6.5 million, with the winner earning $1 million.

Originally a mid-June event, it was played in late July from 2003 to 2012, then moved to mid-September in 2013 when it became the final major for both tours.

In July 2011 it was announced that beginning in 2013, the Evian Masters would be renamed "The Evian Championship" and would become the fifth major on the LPGA Tour schedule and move to September.

After the 2017 Evian Championship was reduced to 54 holes, LPGA commissioner Mike Whan admitted it was a mistake to move the major to a September date and vowed to move it back to summer by 2019. Furthermore, major changes in 2019 for the majors in men's golf, which will now be held in consecutive months – April, May, June, July – means the Evian can be held in August and be the final major in professional golf, men's or women's. Ultimately, the new date for the Evian was set as the last full weekend in July, the week after The Open Championship (men's).

In February 2021, the tournament organizers and French asset management firm Amundi jointly announced that the firm had become the tournament's title sponsor effective with the 2021 event to run for five years.

Course
Evian Resort Golf Club – (1994–present)
(a.k.a. Domaine du Royal Club Evian)

Field
Prior to 2007, the event included 78 players, about half the size of a full-field LPGA Tour event, and was held over four days without a cut, meaning all players played all four days regardless of their scores. Beginning in 2007, the field was expanded to 90 players and a cut added after the second round. A cut means the players with the lowest 70 scores and anyone tied for 70th place play all four rounds and win prize money based on their final standing in the tournament. The other players are eliminated after the second round. The field was increased to 111 players in 2010 and 120 when it became a major in 2013.

Scoring record
The tournament scoring record of 263 (−21) was set by Chun In-gee in 2016.

Winners

LET and LPGA co-sanctioned major (2013–present)

* Reduced to 54 holes due to rain

LET and LPGA co-sanctioned event (2000–2012)

LET event (1994–1999)

In 2017 Nordqvist won with a bogey 5 on the first extra hole. In 2009 Miyazato won with a birdie 4 on the first extra hole. In 2008 Alfredsson won with a birdie 4 on the third extra hole, Park having been eliminated when the other two players made birdies on the first extra hole. In 2007 Gulbis beat Jang with a birdie 4 on the first extra hole. In 2000 Sörenstam beat Webb with an eagle 3 on the first extra hole. In 1997 Kobayashi beat Nicholas with an eagle 3 on the first extra hole.

Multiple winners
Helen Alfredsson (1994, 1998, 2008)
Laura Davies (1995, 1996)
Annika Sörenstam (2000, 2002)
Ai Miyazato (2009, 2011)

References

External links

Coverage on the Ladies European Tour's official site
LPGA Tour official tournament microsite
Evian Masters Golf Club

 
Ladies European Tour events
LPGA Tour events
Women's major golf championships
Golf tournaments in France
Sport in Haute-Savoie
Recurring sporting events established in 1994
1994 establishments in France